Fayetteville is a village on the Kaskaskia River in St. Clair County, Illinois, United States. The population was 384 at the 2000 census.

Geography
Fayetteville is located at  (38.376957, -89.795023).

Demographics

As of the census of 2000, there were 384 people, 138 households, and 105 families residing in the village. The racial makeup of the village was 99.22% White, 0.26% Asian, and 0.52% from two or more races. Hispanic or Latino of any race were 1.30% of the population.

There were 138 households, out of which 35.5% had children under the age of 18 living with them, 64.5% were married couples living together, 8.0% had a female householder with no husband present, and 23.9% were non-families. 18.8% of all households were made up of individuals, and 5.8% had someone living alone who was 65 years of age or older. The average household size was 2.78 and the average family size was 3.22.

In the village, the population was spread out, with 27.6% under the age of 18, 8.6% from 18 to 24, 30.5% from 25 to 44, 23.7% from 45 to 64, and 9.6% who were 65 years of age or older. The median age was 35 years. For every 100 females, there were 111.0 males. For every 100 females age 18 and over, there were 110.6 males.

The median income for a household in the village was $35,417, and the median income for a family was $37,500. Males had a median income of $26,250 versus $22,045 for females. The per capita income for the village was $12,163. About 16.7% of families and 21.0% of the population were below the poverty line, including 39.3% of those under age 18 and none of those age 65 or over.

References

Villages in St. Clair County, Illinois
Villages in Illinois